An orexin receptor antagonist, or orexin antagonist, is a drug that inhibits the effect of orexin by acting as a receptor antagonist of one or both of the orexin receptors, OX1 and OX2. Medical applications include treatment of sleep disorders such as insomnia.

Examples

Marketed
 Daridorexant (nemorexant; Quviviq) – dual OX1 and OX2 antagonist – approved for insomnia in January 2022, formerly under development for sleep apnea – half-life 8 hours
 Lemborexant (Dayvigo) – dual OX1 and OX2 antagonist – approved for insomnia in December 2019 and released June 1 2020, under development for circadian rhythm sleep disorders, chronic obstructive pulmonary disease, and sleep apnea – half-life 17–55 hours
 Suvorexant (Belsomra) – dual OX1 and OX2 antagonist – approved for insomnia in August 2014, under development for delirium – half-life 12 hours

Under development
 Seltorexant (MIN-202, JNJ-42847922, JNJ-922) – selective OX2 antagonist – under development for major depressive disorder, insomnia, and sleep apnea, up to phase 3 – half-life 2–3 hours 
 Vornorexant (ORN-0829, TS-142) – dual OX1 and OX2 antagonist – under development for insomnia and sleep apnea, up to phase 2 – half-life 1.5–3 hours

Not marketed
 ACT-335827 – selective OX1 antagonist
 Almorexant (ACT-078573) – dual OX1 and OX2 antagonist – development of the drug was abandoned in January 2011 
 EMPA – selective OX2 antagonist
 Filorexant (MK-6096) – dual OX1 and OX2 antagonist – development was discontinued in 2015 
 GSK-649868 (SB-649868) – dual OX1 and OX2 antagonist – was in development for potential use in sleep disorders
 JNJ-10397049 – selective OX2 antagonist
 RTIOX-276 – selective OX1 antagonist
 SB-334867 – first non-peptide selective OX1 antagonist – has been shown to produce sedative and anorectic effects in animals
 SB-408124 – selective OX1 antagonist
 TCS-OX2-29 – first non-peptide selective OX2 antagonist

Medical uses

Insomnia
Orexin receptor antagonists dose-dependently improve sleep parameters including latency to persistent sleep (LPS), wake after sleep onset (WASO), sleep efficiency (SE), total sleep time (TST), and sleep quality (SQ).

Network meta-analyses have found that orexin receptor antagonists including suvorexant and lemborexant are more effective in the treatment of insomnia than other sleep aids including benzodiazepines (e.g., triazolam, temazepam), Z-drugs (e.g., zolpidem, zopiclone), antihistamines (e.g., doxepin, diphenhydramine, doxylamine), antidepressants (e.g., trazodone, mirtazapine, amitriptyline), anticonvulsants (e.g., gabapentin, pregabalin), and melatonin receptor agonists (e.g., melatonin, ramelteon).

Orexin receptor antagonists are not currently used as first-line treatments for insomnia due to cost and concerns about possible misuse liability.

Delirium
Suvorexant appears to be effective in the prevention of delirium.

Side effects
Side effects of orexin receptor antagonists include somnolence, daytime sleepiness and sedation, headache, abnormal dreams, fatigue, and dry mouth.

Rates of somnolence or fatigue with orexin receptor antagonists in clinical trials were 7% (vs. 3% with placebo) for suvorexant 15 to 20mg, 7 to 10% (vs. 1.3% for placebo) for lemborexant 5 to 10mg, and 5 to 6% (vs. 4% with placebo) for daridorexant 25 to 50mg.

Pharmacology

Pharmacokinetics
The elimination half-lives of clinically used orexin receptor antagonists are 12 hours for suvorexant, about 17 to 19 hours ("effective" half-life) or 55 hours (terminal elimination half-life) for lemborexant, and 6 to 10 hours for daridorexant. The elimination half-lives of investigational orexin receptor antagonists are 2 to 3 hours for seltorexant and about 1.5 to 3 hours for vornorexant.

Research
Filorexant was studied for but was not found to be effective in the treatment of diabetic neuropathy, migraine, and major depressive disorder in phase 2 clinical trials. Seltorexant is under development for treatment of major depressive disorder however and is in phase 3 trials for this indication. Also, suvorexant is in a phase 4 trial for use as an adjunct to antidepressant therapy in people with major depressive disorder and residual insomnia.

References

External links